The AACTA Award for Best Television Comedy Series is an accolade given by the Australian Academy of Cinema and Television Arts (AACTA), a non-profit organisation whose aim is to "identify, award, promote and celebrate Australia's greatest achievements in film and television." The award is handed out at the annual AACTA Awards, which rewards achievements in Australian feature film, television, documentaries and short films. From 2003 to 2010, the category was presented by the Australian Film Institute (AFI), the Academy's parent organisation, at the annual Australian Film Institute Awards (known as the AFI Awards). When the AFI launched the Academy in 2011, it changed the annual ceremony to the AACTA Awards, with the current prize being a continuum of the AFI Award for Best Television Comedy Series.

The award was first handed out in 2003 it was called Best Comedy Series – Sitcom or Sketch until 2005, when it was renamed Best Television Comedy Series. In 2013, the Academy announced that because of a lack of funds, due to the loss of Samsung as a naming rights sponsor for the AACTA Awards, some categories were either merged or removed from the 2014 Awards. This included the award for Best Television Comedy Series which was merged with the Best Light Entertainment Television Series prize, under the name Best Television Comedy or Light Entertainment Series. However, AACTA announced that it will split the category, and Best Television Comedy Series will be given as a stand-alone award once again for the 2015 presentation.

The AACTA Award for Best Television Comedy Series is given to the producer of the winning production. To be eligible for nomination, the program must be a situation comedy or sketch series, with no less than four substantially scripted episodes, no more than one hour in length. Each episode must contain either a "continuing story with an ongoing plot and characters" or "a series of unrelated sketches."

Review with Myles Barlow, Utopia and The Letdown have earned two awards, more than any other program. Selin Yaman and John Safran are the most awarded producers with two wins, and Nicole Minchin, Adam Zwar, Robyn Butler and Wayne Hope have received the most nominations with four each.

Winners and nominees
In the following table, the years listed correspond to the year that the television programme aired on Australian television; the ceremonies are usually held the following year. The television series whose name is emphasised in boldface and highlighted in yellow has won the award. Those that are neither highlighted nor in bold are the nominees. When sorted chronologically, the table always lists the winning program first and then the other nominees.

See also
 AACTA Awards

References

Further reading

C
Australian comedy awards
Awards established in 2003